The 2017 season is Home United's 22nd consecutive season in the top flight of Singapore football and in the S.League. Along with the S.League, the club will also compete in the Prime League, the Singapore Cup, Singapore League Cup and the 2017 AFC Cup.

Squad

S.League squad

Prime League squad

Coaching staff

Transfer

Pre-season transfer
Source

In

Out

Mid-season transfers

In

Out

Friendlies

Pre-season friendlies

In Season friendlies

Team statistics

Appearances and goals

Numbers in parentheses denote appearances as substitute.

Competitions

Overview

S.League

Singapore Cup

Quarter-final

Home United won 6–2 on aggregate.

Semi-final

Home United lost 2–5 on aggregate.

3rd/4th place

Singapore TNP League Cup

Group matches

AFC Cup

Qualifying play-off

Group stage

Knockout stage

References

Home United FC seasons
Singaporean football clubs 2017 season